Henry English Read (December 25, 1824 – November 9, 1868) was an American politician from Kentucky who served in the Confederate States Congress during the American Civil War.
Read was born in LaRue County, Kentucky. He represented the state in the First Confederate Congress and the Second Confederate Congress.
Three years after the war, he committed suicide. Interment was in the Elizabethtown City Cemetery in Elizabethtown, Kentucky.

Obituary 
General Henry English Read's obituary from the Daily Ledger (New Albany, IN Newspaper - Across from Louisville, KY)

The article states:

References 
 Political Graveyard

1824 births
1868 deaths
American politicians who committed suicide
Members of the Confederate House of Representatives from Kentucky
19th-century American politicians
People from LaRue County, Kentucky
1860s suicides